Iridomyrmex splendens is a species of ant in the genus Iridomyrmex. Described by Forel in 1907, the ant is mainly distributed in the southern regions of Australia, commonly found in dry sclerophyll woodland, and nests are found under logs.

References

External links

Iridomyrmex
Hymenoptera of Australia
Insects described in 1907